Glencorse Reservoir is a reservoir in Midlothian, Scotland, two miles west of Glencorse, in the Pentland Hills.

It is retained by an earth dam, and it was built between 1820 and 1824 by James Jardine to provide water for the mills of Auchendinny, Milton Bridge and Glencorse, and to supply drinking water to the citizens of Edinburgh. The reservoir is the property of Scottish Water.

The reservoir was built to provide water to compensate the mills at Glencorse, Milton Bridge and Auchendinny and to ensure a supply of drinking water to Edinburgh through a cast-iron pipe which took water to two small reservoirs in the city, at Castlehill and near George Heriot's School.

A Water Treatment Works was opened at Glencorse in 2012 to replace aged facilities at Alnwickhill and Fairmilehead and treat water from Talla, Fruid and Megget reservoirs. In 2019, Glencorse Water Treatment Works was reported to have the capacity to supply up to 175 million litres of water per day and was supplying water to up to 450,000 customers in parts of West Lothian and Edinburgh.

Beneath the surface of the reservoir are the remains of St Catherine's of the Hopes, a 13th century chapel.

See also
Edgelaw Reservoir
Gladhouse Reservoir
North Esk Reservoir
Rosebery Reservoir
List of reservoirs and dams in the United Kingdom

References

External links

Scottish Water - plans for new Glencorse Water Treatment Works
Royal Collection of Ancient and Historical Monuments of Scotland: Collaboration Projects with Defence Estates  -  Archaeological investigation
BBC Radio Four, Open Country, programme about the Pentland Hills and reservoirs
Forestry Commission - Picture Library - Glencorse Reservoir
The Scotsman, 17 February 2008:Walk of the Week - Glencorse, Loganlea and Threipmuir Reservoirs, Pentlands
Photos of reservoirs

Reservoirs in Midlothian